Fictibacillus solisalsi is a Gram-positive, rod-shaped, halotolerant, alkaliphilic and motile bacterium from the genus of Fictibacillus which has been isolated from saline soil from Shanxi in China.

References

External links 

Type strain of Fictibacillus solisalsi at BacDive -  the Bacterial Diversity Metadatabase

Bacillaceae
Bacteria described in 2009